Siegfried Müller is a retired German sidecarcross passenger and, together with his driver Reinhard Böhler, the first-ever World Champion in the sport.

He has also won the German national sidecarcross championship in 1980.

Biography

Sidecarcross world championship results
Siegfried Müller made his debut in the FIM Cup, a predecessor of the world championship, in 1974, in the last year of the competition. With his driver, Eugen Siegle †2-16-2011, he achieved a sixth place overall.

From 1975 onwards, the FIM Cup was re-branded as FIM European Championship but the two did not take part in the 1975 edition and only entered again in 1976. This time, they finished fifth overall. Müller raced for two more seasons with Siegle but now with lesser success.

He joined Reinhard Böhler for the 1979 season. From 1980 onwards, the European championship was renamed the FIM World Championship and Siegfried Müller, together with Reinhard Böhler, became the first world champion and the only ones from Germany so far. They took out the title with an 88 point gap to the second placed team and also won the German championship.

Müller raced Böhler in 1981 before retiring from international competition.

Season by season
The competition which was to become the sidecarcross world championship in 1980 originated as the FIM Cup in 1971 and was renamed to European championship in 1975. Müller's results in these three competitions were:

Source:

Honours

World Championship
 Champions: (1) 1980

Germany
 Champions: (1) 1980

References

External links
 The official FIM website
 The World Championship on Sidecarcross.com

Living people
German sidecarcross riders
Year of birth missing (living people)